Interstate 895 is a bypass through Baltimore, Maryland.

Interstate 895 may also refer to:
Interstate 895 (Rhode Island–Massachusetts), a never-built bypass of Providence, Rhode Island
New York State Route 895, a short connector in Bronx, New York formerly numbered Interstate 895
Interstate 895 (New Jersey–Pennsylvania), a never-built connector northeast of Philadelphia, Pennsylvania
Interstate 95 in Delaware, temporarily signed as Interstate 895 through Wilmington
Part of eastern Interstate 76 (now Interstate 676), a freeway through Philadelphia, Pennsylvania

See also
Virginia State Route 895, a connector in Richmond, Virginia that was originally slated to become Interstate 895.
New York State Route 895, a boulevard in New York City, formerly a freeway signed as Interstate 895.

95-8
8